ALTE or alte can refer to:

Places
 Alte, village in Portugal
 Alte River, river in Portugal

Other uses
Apparent life-threatening events
Association of Language Testers in Europe

See also 
 Der Alte (disambiguation)
 Alter (disambiguation)